HMS Queen Charlotte was a 100-gun first-rate ship of the line of the Royal Navy, launched on 15 April 1790 at Chatham. She was built to the draught of  designed by Sir Edward Hunt, though with a modified armament.

History
In 1794 Queen Charlotte was the flagship of Admiral Lord Howe at the Battle of the Glorious First of June, and in 1795 under Captain Andrew Snape Douglas she took part in the Battle of Groix.

In 1798, some of her crew were court-martialed for mutiny.

Fate

At about 6am on 17 March 1800, whilst operating as the flagship of Vice-Admiral Lord Keith, Queen Charlotte was reconnoitring the island of Capraia, in the Tuscan Archipelago, when she caught fire. Keith was not aboard at the time and observed the disaster from the shore.

The fire was believed to have resulted from someone having accidentally thrown loose hay on a match tub. Two or three American vessels lying at anchor off Leghorn were able to render assistance, losing several men in the effort as the vessel's guns, which were loaded, cooked off in the heat. Captain A. Tod wrote several accounts of the disaster that he gave to sailors to give to the Admiralty should they survive. He himself perished with his ship. The crew was unable to extinguish the flames and at about 11am the ship blew up with the loss of 673 officers and men.

Citations

References

 
 Lavery, Brian (2003): The Ship of the Line - Volume 1: The development of the battlefleet 1650-1850. Conway Maritime Press. .
 Winfield, Rif (2008): British Warships in the Age of Sail: 1793 - 1817. Seaforth Publishing. .

External links
 
 Memorials and Monuments in Portsmouth (retrieved 27 September 2007).

Ships of the line of the Royal Navy
1790 ships
Ships built in England
Maritime incidents in 1800
Ships sunk by non-combat internal explosions
Shipwrecks in the Mediterranean Sea